Salvia plebeia is an annual or biennial herb that is native to a wide region of Asia. Inflorescences are 6-flowered verticillasters in racemes or panicles, with a distinctly small corolla that comes in a wide variety of colors: reddish, purplish, purple, blue-purple, to blue, and rarely white.

Notes

External links
 

plebeia
Flora of China